A  driving licence is required in Malaysia before a person is allowed to drive a motor vehicle of any description on a road in Malaysia under the Road Transport Act 1987, section 26(1). Under section 26(1) of the Road Transport Act, an individual must possess a valid driving licence before being permitted to drive on the road, or can be prosecuted under section 26(2). Upon conviction, the miscreant is liable to fines or jail or both. Driving licence holders are subject to all traffic rules stated in the Road Transport Act 1987.

Types of driving licence

Classes of driving licence
The following classes are printed on the new high security driving licence:

Vocational licence types and classes:

Road Safety System (KEJARA) 
This system is applicable to both Probationary and Competent driving licences. This system was introduced to:
 i - Reduce accident rates.
 ii - To raise awareness of road safety towards all drivers.
 iii - Ensure all drivers to always obey the traffic laws.
 iv - Raise disciplined, responsible and cognizant drivers on the road.
 v - Take legal actions towards any drivers whom had breached the laws.

Driving licence suspension system:

Drivers whose licence has been suspended three times in a period of five years will have their driving licence revoked and are not allowed to drive or receive a driver’s licence for 12 months from the date of the licence was revoked.

Road penalties associated with KEJARA demerit points:

Conversion of driving licence

Foreigners holding driving licences from countries with signatories to any treaty or agreement with Malaysia may apply for conversion of driving licence. Refer to section 28 of Road Transport Act, foreigners from ASEAN member countries only need to possess a valid driving licence to drive in Malaysia. From 2018 until December 2020 this process was stopped. One needs apply for an international driving license or enroll at a driving school to get a valid license. But from 31 December 2020, all the foreigner can convert their driving license. To know the process follow the JPJ website Malaysia.

References

External links
Malaysia JPJ Website 

Malaysia
Road transport in Malaysia